K.K.Kity was a J-pop group formed by Koichi Domoto, part of the Johnny's Jr. group,  initially under the name J-Support. Later the name of this group changed into K.K.Kity.

Members
 Keiichiro Koyama born 1 May 1984
 Shigeaki Kato born July 11, 1987
 Hironori Kusano  born February 15, 1988
 Kyohei Iida
 Kotaro Takeuchi
 Wataru Yokoo

History
In 2001 Koichi Domoto made a project for a TV show. Here he selected some of the Johnny's Juniors to become a Johnny's Jr. group with 6 members. He gave them the name J-Support and chose Keiichiro Koyama as the leader, because he was the eldest.

To know them better, Koichi interviewed them one by one. He also gave them a song, Private Hearts, that he composed himself. And as their producer he gave them some tasks to increase their ability, like doing a backflip as part of their performance. He also gave them the opportunity to perform at his show.

Later on, their name changed into K.K.Kity considering the letters of the member's family name.

Activities
As all Johnny's Junior's activities, they back danced for their senpais at concerts.
They also performed their senpai's song and also their own song in the Shounen Club show aired from NHK.

Beside that, the K.K.K (Koyama, Kato and Kusano) were also regular members at a TV Show called Ya-Ya-yah.

Break Up
As J-Support they all sang and danced equally. Later on K.K.K became the main vocalists.

In 2003 K.K.K debuted as members from NEWS.

Later on, Kyohei Iida and Wataru Yokoo became members of another Johnny's Jr. group called Kis-My-Ft2, while Kotaro Takeuchi became a member of M.A.D..

Songs
 Private Hearts (composed by Koichi Domoto)
 Stand Up (English version)

These songs were later recorded by NEWS and are in their first single NewS Nippon.

 千年のLove Song (Sennen no Love Song)
This song has become a Kis-My-Ft2 song.

References

External links
Official Japanese Website 
Official Johnny's Asia Website

See also
Johnny & Associates
Johnny's Jr.

Other Johnny's Jr. groups
 A.B.C-Z
 Ya-Ya-yah
 Kis-My-Ft2
 Question?

Japanese boy bands
Japanese pop music groups
Japanese idol groups
Johnny & Associates
Musical groups from Tokyo